Fifth Church of Christ, Scientist is an historic Classical Revival-style Christian Science church building located at 9 East 43rd Street near Madison Avenue and Grand Central Terminal in Manhattan, New York City. Built in 1921 on the former site of St. Bartholomew's Episcopal Church. Fifth Church of Christ, Scientist, is unusual in that it occupies part of the first two stories of a 21-story office building that was originally named the Canadian Pacific Building.  The church auditorium seats 1800 people.

History
Organized in 1901, Fifth Church of Christ, Scientist, met first at 228 West 45th Street in the former building of another Episcopal church, the Church of Saint Mary the Virgin. Around 1911 the congregation moved to a church building at 245 Madison Avenue at East 38th Street which had been built for Zion Episcopal Church and later used by South (Dutch) Reformed Church. This building was razed in 1917. In 1921, Fifth Church became part of a bonding arrangement for the construction of the 21-story Canadian Pacific Building. Under it the church received a long-term lease for the space it still occupies.

Current status
Fifth Church of Christ, Scientist, is still an active congregation in this location. The Canadian Pacific Building after being known as 342 Madison Avenue for years is now 340 Madison Avenue and has been extensively remodeled to present a modern glass exterior.

References

External links

 St. Bartholomew's History
 Skyscraper Page listing for Canadian Pacific Building, 342 Madison Avenue

Christian Science churches in New York City
Churches in Manhattan
Neoclassical architecture in New York City
Churches completed in 1921
20th-century Christian Science church buildings
Midtown Manhattan
Neoclassical church buildings in the United States